= Equipe Europe =

Equipe Europe is a French motorsport team founded in 1989 by Yvan Mahé. The team restores and enters historic cars in FIA regulated competitions. Equipe Europe is one of leader motorsport team in Europe

== 2011 season ==
Date	Championship	Race
2 April 2011	Classic Endurance Series	Dix Mille tours Navarra (Esp)
11 April 2011	Tour auto 2011	Rallye (Fra)
27 May 2011	Classic endurance Series	Spa-Francorchamps Classic (Bel)
1 July 2011	Classic endurance Series	Imola (Ita)
8 September 2011	Classic endurance Series	Silverstone (Eng)
23 September 2011	Classic endurance Series	Estoril (Por)
7 October 2011	Classic endurance Series	Dix Mille Tours Paul Ricard HTTT (Fra)
